Tyler M. Arnold (born July 1992) is an American record executive who has acted as the A&R Vice President of Republic Records from 2020 to 2022 after joining the company in 2014 and the President of Mercury Records since 2022. He is credited with signing Post Malone, Clairo, Jeremy Zucker, Chelsea Cutler, and Metro Boomin to the company, as well as forming corporate alliances with Big Loud and Imperial Records. He was elected as apart of the 2022 Forbes 30 Under 30.

References

Living people
1992 births

Northeastern University alumni

Businesspeople from Connecticut